Equatair (Equatorial Express Airlines) was an airline in Equatorial Guinea.

The airline was on the list of air carriers banned in the European Union.

History
Equatair was established in December 2004. Its predecessor Aerolíneas de Guinea Ecuatorial was closed by order of the government and its Antonov aircraft was used to create Equatair. The aircraft was subsequently involved in a fatal accident, thus leaving the airline without any aircraft. In 2006 Equatair was therefore disestablished.

Accidents and incidents
 On 16 July 2005, an Antonov 24 crashed into a mountainous area near Baney, killing all 60 passengers and crew on board.

References

Defunct airlines of Equatorial Guinea
Airlines disestablished in 2006
2006 disestablishments in Africa
Airlines established in 2004
2004 establishments in Africa